Katherine Jill Trolove (born 4 August 1967 in Christchurch, New Zealand) is a former field hockey player from New Zealand, who finished in eight position with the National Women's Field Hockey Team at the 1992 Summer Olympics in Barcelona. She was also a member of the squad that won the bronze medal at the 1998 Commonwealth Games in Kuala Lumpur. Two years later, at the 2000 Summer Olympics in Sydney, Trolove ended up sixth with The Black Sticks.

References

External links
 

New Zealand female field hockey players
Olympic field hockey players of New Zealand
Field hockey players at the 1992 Summer Olympics
Field hockey players at the 2000 Summer Olympics
Field hockey players from Christchurch
Commonwealth Games bronze medallists for New Zealand
1967 births
Living people
Field hockey players at the 1998 Commonwealth Games
Commonwealth Games medallists in field hockey
Medallists at the 1998 Commonwealth Games